Allonby is a village on the coast of the Allerdale district in Cumbria, England. Other nearby settlements include Crosscanonby, Edderside, Hayton, and Salta.

Etymology
'Allonby' is " 'Alein's bȳ'...'Alein' is a French personal name of Breton origin."
('Bȳ' is a late Old English word from Old Norse 'bȳr' and Swedish or Danish 'by' meaning 'village', 'hamlet').

Geographical aspect
The village overlooks Allonby Bay in the Solway Firth. The area is within the Solway Coast Area of Outstanding Natural Beauty, and the historic county of Cumberland.  Allonby, and the five-mile coastal strip of the bay, has views across the Solway to the Galloway hills of southern Scotland. Both the South Saltpans beach and the West Winds beach were awarded the Blue flag rural beach award in 2005. The village is located on the  Cumbria Coastal Way long distance footpath.

History
From the late 18th century until the mid 19th century, Allonby was home to a small fishing fleet. The main catch was herring. Fish yards were built where these were salted and packed in barrels made on the premises. There was also a smoke house where kippers were produced. In the early part of the 19th century Allonby was a popular sea-bathing resort. Baths were built in 1835. The buildings still survive as private residences in the Market Square.

The village has a 17th century coaching inn now known as the Ship Hotel. Charles Dickens and Wilkie Collins stayed overnight at the hostelry in 1857 (due to Collins' illness) while they were touring northern Cumberland, Dickens subsequently described Allonby as a 'dreary little place'.

The Reading Room, opened in 1862, was designed by Alfred Waterhouse, the Victorian architect, when he was only 32 years old. The building was largely financed by Joseph Pease who was Britain's first Quaker MP.

Governance
Allonby, is part of the Workington constituency of the UK parliament. The current Member of Parliament is Mark Jenkinson, a member of the Conservative Party, who unseated Sue Hayman, a member of the Labour Party, at the 2019 General Election. The Labour Party had previously won the seat in every general election since 1979; the Conservative Party had only been elected once in Workington since the Second World War: in the  1976 Workington by-election.

Before Brexit, it was in the North West England European Parliamentary Constituency.

For Local Government purposes it is in the Silloth + Solway Coast  Ward of Allerdale Borough Council and the  Aspatria Ward of Cumbria County Council.

The village also has its own Parish Council; Allonby Parish Council.

Notable residents
Joseph Huddart was born here in 1741.

See also

Listed buildings in Allonby

References

External links

Allonby Cumbria Website
  Cumbria County History Trust: Allonby (nb: provisional research only - see Talk page)
Solway Coast AONB
Ramblers' Association, Cumbria Coastal Way
Solway Plain past and present - Allonby
Allonby

Villages in Cumbria
Allerdale
Populated coastal places in Cumbria
Civil parishes in Cumbria